Ron Magers (born August 27, 1944) is a former American news anchor. Magers worked for WLS-TV, the ABC owned-and-operated station in Chicago, Illinois, where he co-anchored the top-rated 5:00 p.m. and 10:00 p.m. broadcasts with Cheryl Burton and Kathy Brock, respectively. Magers is the brother of Paul Magers, a former television anchor and reporter for KCBS-TV, the CBS owned-and-operated station in Los Angeles.

Early life and career
Born in San Bernardino, California, Magers grew up in Cordova, Alaska and Ellensburg, Washington. Magers gained early broadcasting experience as a high school student in Toppenish, Washington, when he began to host radio shows as a part-time job. He began his professional career in television in 1965, when he joined KEZI-TV in Eugene, Oregon as a reporter and news contributor. He later produced and anchored the 11 p.m. newscast at KGW-TV in Portland, Ore. (1967–68). From 1968-74, Magers worked as a reporter and anchor at KPIX-TV in San Francisco, Calif. He also hosted a Group W 30 minute weekly  the nationally syndicated program in 1971 titled, "Ron Magers Electric Impressions".

Minneapolis – Saint Paul
After moving to Minnesota, Magers was hired as the principal anchor for KSTP-TV, the ABC (formerly NBC) affiliate in Minneapolis – Saint Paul from 1974 to 1981. He was later joined by co-anchor Cyndy Brucato. This popular anchor team led the top-rated Twin Cities newscasts at that time.

Chicago
From 1981 to 1997, Magers co-anchored the 5, 6, and 10 p.m. newscasts of WMAQ-TV. Magers and then co-anchor Carol Marin made national headlines in early May 1997 when they left Channel 5. The decision to leave was in protest of the station's hiring of Jerry Springer as commentator for the 10:00 p.m. newscasts.  WMAQ management allowed both anchors an early release from their contracts. Both thought that the addition of Springer would have given the broadcast an unnecessary tabloid feel. Springer only made two commentaries before he too left his position as contributor.

Magers joined WLS in 1998 as a 5:00 p.m. anchor alongside Diann Burns. He became co-anchor of the 10:00 p.m. newscasts in 2002, after the retirement of long-time anchor John Drury. Magers has appeared in a feature segment and was a commentator on The Roe Conn Show on WLS (AM) since 1997, with a gap of several months in 2009/10 because of the bankruptcy of WLS's parent company. He was rehired following the station's sale. On May 25, 2016 Magers retired from ABC  with a final late evening newscast with tributes from staff and colleagues.    ABC7 anchor Alan Krashesky succeeded Magers at 5:00 p.m. alongside Cheryl Burton and alongside Kathy Brock at 6:00 and 10:00 p.m.

Awards
Magers has won numerous awards including six Chicago Emmy Awards, a Peter Lisagor Award and a National Press Club citation. In addition, he has won an Associated Press award, an Illinois Broadcasters Association award, the Ohio State Award, and an Ethics Award from the Society of Professional Journalists.

References

External links
Bio at abc7chicago.com at wayback.archive.org/web
 http://abc7chicago.com/tag/ron-magers/

American television journalists
Living people
Television anchors from Chicago
Television anchors from San Francisco
1944 births
American male journalists
Television anchors from Minneapolis–Saint Paul, Minnesota
People from San Bernardino, California
People from Cordova, Alaska
People from Ellensburg, Washington